The 1985 National Invitation Tournament was the 1985 edition of the annual NCAA college basketball competition.  The tournament began on Tuesday, March 12, 1985, and ended when the UCLA Bruins defeated Indiana Hoosiers in the NIT championship game on Friday, March 29, 1985, at Madison Square Garden. The Bruins were led by first-year head coach Walt Hazzard.

Selected teams
Below is a list of the 32 teams selected for the tournament.

Bracket
Below are the four first round brackets, along with the four-team championship bracket.

Semifinals & finals

All-tournament team
Nigel Miguel, UCLA
Steve Alford, Indiana
Uwe Blab, Indiana
Anthony Richardson, Tennessee
Billy Thompson, Louisville

Source:

See also
 1985 National Women's Invitational Tournament
 1985 NCAA Division I men's basketball tournament
 1985 NCAA Division II men's basketball tournament
 1985 NCAA Division III men's basketball tournament
 1985 NCAA Division I women's basketball tournament
 1985 NCAA Division II women's basketball tournament
 1985 NCAA Division III women's basketball tournament
 1985 NAIA Division I men's basketball tournament
 1985 NAIA Division I women's basketball tournament

References

National Invitation
National Invitation Tournament
1980s in Manhattan
Basketball in New York City
College sports in New York City
Madison Square Garden
National Invitation Tournament
National Invitation Tournament
Sports competitions in New York City
Sports in Manhattan